Poimenesperus carreti is a species of beetle in the family Cerambycidae. It was described by Lisle in 1955.

References

carreti
Beetles described in 1955